Black draught (Latin: Haustous) was a patent medicine used as a purgative in the 19th century and well into the early part of the 20th century, with veterinarians prescribing these to constipated cattle and horses.  It is a saline aperient mixture used along with blue mass.

Isabella Beeton's Book of Household Management (1861) has a recipe for a black draught:
 

Black-Draught is also the name of a once-common commercial liquid syrup laxative, sold since the late 19th century, a cathartic medicine composed of a blend of Senna and magnesia.  Much like castor oil, it was a commonly used folk remedy for many ailments.

"Thedford's Black-Draught" was marketed through booklets such as the 1899 "The Ladies Birthday Almanac" by The Chattanooga Medicine Company.

References

Patent medicines